Maidstone Airport may refer to a number of airports

Current
Maidstone Aerodrome Canada

Defunct
Maidstone Airport, Kent, United Kingdom